Everything's Fine may refer to:

 Everything's Fine (The Summer Set album), 2011
 Everything's Fine (Jean Grae and Quelle Chris album), 2018
 Everything's Fine (Matt Corby album), 2023
 Sarah Cooper: Everything's Fine, a 2020 comedy special streaming video
 Everything's Fine, a 2022 one-man show by Douglas McGrath